The ruddy kingfisher (Halcyon coromanda) is a medium-sized tree kingfisher, widely distributed in east and southeast Asia.

Description

Reaching approximately 25 cm, the ruddy kingfisher has a very large, bright red bill and equally red legs.  The body is rust red, generally deepening to purple at the tail.  There is little sexual dimorphism though some sources report male birds being somewhat brighter in plumage. Due to its preference for heavily forested areas, the kingfisher's high, descending call is more often heard than the bird itself is seen, and these birds generally travel singly or in pairs.

Distribution and habitat

The ruddy kingfisher ranges from South Korea and Japan in the north, south through the Philippines to the Sunda Islands, and west to China and India.  It is migratory, with birds in the northern part of the range migrating as far south as Borneo during winter.  Locally common in southern parts of its range, the ruddy kingfisher is rare in Japan, where it is highly sought after by birders. Ruddy kingfishers inhabit forested areas from the temperate to tropical zones, often in thick jungles and rainforests.

The binomial name recalls the Coromandel Coast of India.

Behaviour and ecology

Food and feeding
Like other kingfishers, ruddy kingfishers generally feed on fish, crustaceans, and large insects. However, in areas with less running water, they are known to eat frogs and other amphibians.

Taxonomy
Halcyon coromanda includes the following subspecies:
 H. c. coromanda - (Latham, 1790)
 H. c. major - (Temminck & Schlegel, 1848)
 H. c. bangsi - (Oberholser, 1915)
 H. c. mizorhina - (Oberholser, 1915)
 H. c. minor - (Temminck & Schlegel, 1848)
 H. c. linae - Hubbard & duPont, 1974
 H. c. claudiae - Hubbard & duPont, 1974
 H. c. rufa - Wallace, 1863
 H. c. pelingensis - Neumann, 1939
 H. c. sulana - Mees, 1970

References

Other sources
 - a photographic essay on the ruddy kingfisher, in Japanese.

ruddy kingfisher
Birds of Northeast India
Birds of Bangladesh
Birds of Japan
Birds of Korea
Birds of Southeast Asia
ruddy kingfisher